Jõeranna is a village in Hiiumaa Parish, Hiiu County in northwestern Estonia.

The village is first mentioned in about 1913 (Іоэранна). Historically, the village was part of Kõrgessaare Manor.

The village is located at Jõesuu Bay. At the village, Allikoja Stream and Jõeranna Stream flow into the bay.

References

Villages in Hiiu County